Stefania Pirozzi (born 16 December 1993 in Benevento) is an Italian swimmer who competes in the Women's 400m individual medley. At the 2012 Summer Olympics she finished 22nd overall in the heats in the Women's 400 metre individual medley and failed to reach the final. At the 2020 Summer Olympics, she competed in the 4 × 200 m freestyle relay.

Pirozzi is an athlete of the Gruppo Sportivo Fiamme Oro.

References

External links

1993 births
Living people
Italian female swimmers
Italian female medley swimmers
Sportspeople from Benevento
Swimmers of Fiamme Oro
Olympic swimmers of Italy
Swimmers at the 2012 Summer Olympics
Swimmers at the 2016 Summer Olympics
Swimmers at the 2020 Summer Olympics
Swimmers at the 2010 Summer Youth Olympics
Swimmers at the 2013 Mediterranean Games
Swimmers at the 2018 Mediterranean Games
Mediterranean Games medalists in swimming
Mediterranean Games gold medalists for Italy
Mediterranean Games silver medalists for Italy
European Aquatics Championships medalists in swimming
21st-century Italian women